The 2020 Colorado Rockies season was the franchise's 28th in Major League Baseball. It was their 26th season at Coors Field.

On March 12, 2020, MLB announced that because of the COVID-19 pandemic, the start of the regular season would be delayed by at least two weeks in addition to the remainder of spring training being cancelled. Four days later, it was announced that the start of the season would be pushed back indefinitely due to the recommendation made by the CDC to restrict events of more than 50 people for eight weeks. On June 23, commissioner Rob Manfred unilaterally implemented a 60-game season. Players reported to training camps on July 1 in order to resume spring training and prepare for a July 24 Opening Day.

The Rockies started the season 11–3, but would lose the remaining 31 of 45 games.  The team's biggest achievement was being the only team to beat the Dodgers in a series in 2020, as they won two out of three at Dodger Stadium in early September.

Regular season

Season standings

National League West

National League Wild Card

Record vs. opponents

Detailed records

Transactions
 August 14, 2020: Jesús Tinoco was traded by the Rockies to the Miami Marlins in exchange for Chad Smith (minors).
 August 30, 2020: Mychal Givens was traded by the Baltimore Orioles to the Colorado Rockies in exchange for Tyler Nevin (minors), Terrin Vavra (minors), and a player to be named later.
 August 31, 2020: Kevin Pillar was traded by the Boston Red Sox to the Colorado Rockies in exchange for a player to be named later and international bonus pool money.

Game log 

|- style="background:#fbb;"
| 1 || July 24 || @ Rangers || 0–1 || Lynn (1–0) || Márquez (0–1) || Leclerc (1) || 0–1 || L1
|- style="background:#cfc;"
| 2 || July 25 || @ Rangers || 3–2 || Bard (1–0) || Minor (0–1) || Davis (1) || 1–1 || W1
|- style="background:#cfc;"
| 3 || July 26 || @ Rangers || 5–2 || Freeland (1–0) || Palumbo (0–1) || Davis (2) || 2–1 || W2
|- style="background:#cfc;"
| 4 || July 28 || @ Athletics || 8–3 || Senzatela (1–0) || Mengden (0–1) || — || 3–1 || W3
|- style="background:#cfc;"
| 5 || July 29 || @ Athletics || 5–1 || Márquez (1–1) || Montas (0–1) || — || 4–1 || W4
|- style="background:#fbb;"
| 6 || July 31 || Padres || 7–8 || Stammen (1–1) || Davis (0–1) || Pomeranz (2) || 4–2 || L1
|-

|- style="background:#cfc;"
| 7 || August 1 || Padres || 6–1 || Freeland (2–0) || Lucchesi (0–1) || — || 5–2 || W1
|- style="background:#cfc;"
| 8 || August 2 || Padres || 9–6 || Senzatela (2–0) || Davies (1–1) || Díaz (1) || 6–2 || W2
|- style="background:#cfc;" 
| 9 || August 3 || Giants || 7–6 || Hoffman (1–0) || Peralta (1–1) || Díaz (2) || 7–2 || W3 
|- style="background:#cfc;"
| 10 || August 4 || Giants || 5–2 || Márquez (2–1) || Gausman (0–1) || Almonte (1) || 8–2 || W4
|- style="background:#fbb;"
| 11 || August 5 || Giants || 3–4 || Webb (1–0) || Gray (0–1) || Gott (3) || 8–3 || L1
|- style="background:#cfc;"
| 12 || August 6 || Giants || 6–4 || Almonte (1–0) || Garcia (0–1) || Díaz (3) || 9–3 || W1
|- style="background:#cfc;"
| 13 || August 7 || @ Mariners || 8–4 || Senzatela (3–0) || Kikuchi (0–1) || — || 10–3 || W2
|- style="background:#cfc;" 
| 14 || August 8 || @ Mariners || 5–0 || Hoffman (2–0) || Misiewicz (0–1) || — || 11–3 || W3 
|- style="background:#fbb;"
| 15 || August 9 || @ Mariners || 3–5 || Sheffield (1–2) || Márquez (2–2) || Williams (3) || 11–4 || L1
|- style="background:#fbb;"
| 16 || August 10 || Diamondbacks || 8–12 || Young (1–0) || Gray (0–2) || Bradley (4) || 11–5 || L2
|- style="background:#cfc;"
| 17 || August 11 || Diamondbacks || 8–7 || Estévez (1–0) || Ginkel (0–1) || Bard (1) || 12–5 || W1
|- style="background:#fbb;"
| 18 || August 12 || Diamondbacks || 7–13 || Chafin (1–1) || Kinley (0–1) || — || 12–6 || L1
|- style="background:#fbb;"
| 19 || August 14 || Rangers || 2–3 || Lynn (3–0) || Bard (1–1) || — || 12–7 || L2
|- style="background:#fbb;"
| 20 || August 15 || Rangers || 4–6 || Gibson (1–2) || Márquez (2–3) || Montero (5) || 12–8 || L3
|- style="background:#cfc;"
| 21 || August 16 || Rangers || 10–6 || Gray (1–2) || Allard (0–1) || Estévez (1) || 13–8 || W1
|- style="background:#fbb;"
| 22 || August 17 || @ Astros || 1–2 || Bielak (3–0) || Freeland (2–1) || Taylor (1) || 13–9 || L1
|- style="background:#fbb;"
| 23 || August 18 || @ Astros || 1–2  || Scrubb (1–0) || Díaz (0–1) || — || 13–10 || L2
|- style="background:#fbb;"
| 24 || August 19 || Astros || 6–13 || Valdez (2–2) || Castellani (0–1) || — || 13–11 || L3
|- style="background:#fbb;"
| 25 || August 20 || Astros || 8–10 || Raley (1–0) || Márquez (2–4) || Pressly (3) || 13–12 || L4
|- style="background:#fbb;"
| 26 || August 21 || @ Dodgers || 1–5 || Buehler (1–0) || Gray (1–3) || — || 13–13 || L5
|- style="background:#fbb;"
| 27 || August 22 || @ Dodgers || 3–4 || Jansen (1–0) || Bard (1–2) || — || 13–14 || L6
|- style="background:#fbb;"
| 28 || August 23 || @ Dodgers || 3–11 || González (1–0) || Senzatela (3–1) || — || 13–15 || L7
|- style="background:#cfc;" 
| 29 || August 24 || @ Diamondbacks || 3–2 || Castellani (1–1) || Widener (0–1) || Bard (2) || 14–15 || W1 
|- style="background:#cfc;" 
| 30 || August 25 || @ Diamondbacks || 5–4 || Díaz (1–1) || Crichton (2–1) || Bard (3) || 15–15 || W2 
|- style="background:#cfc;"
| 31 || August 26 || @ Diamondbacks || 8–7 || Gray (2–3) || Ray (1–4) || Hoffman (1) || 16–15 || W3
|- style="background:#bbb;"
| — || August 27 || @ Diamondbacks || colspan=7 | Postponed (Boycotts due to Jacob Blake shooting); Makeup: September 25
|- style="background:#fbb;"
| 32 || August 28 || Padres || 4–10 || Davies (5–2) || Hoffman (2–1) || — || 16–16 || L1
|- style="background:#cfc;"
| 33 || August 29 || Padres || 4–3 || Bard (2–2) || Stammen (3–2) || — || 17–16 || W1 
|- style="background:#fbb;"
| 34 || August 30 || Padres || 2–13 || Paddack (3–3) || Castellani (1–2) || — || 17–17 || L1
|- style="background:#fbb;"
| 35 || August 31 || Padres || 0–6 || Morejón (1–0) || Márquez (2–5) || — || 17–18 || L2
|-

|- style="background:#fbb;"
| 36 || September 1 || Giants || 5–23 || Gausman (2–2) || Gray (2–4) || — || 17–19 || L3 
|- style="background:#cfc;"
| 37 || September 2 || Giants || 9–6 || Givens (1–1) || Coonrod (0–1) || Bard (4) || 18–19 || W1
|- style="background:#fbb;"
| 38 || September 4 || @ Dodgers || 6–10 || Ferguson (2–0) || Estévez (1–1) || — || 18–20 || L1
|- style="background:#cfc;"
| 39 || September 5 || @ Dodgers || 5–2 || Almonte (2–0) || Treinen (3–2) || Bard (5) || 19–20 || W1
|- style="background:#cfc;"
| 40 || September 6 || @ Dodgers || 7–6 || Almonte (3–0) || Ferguson (2–1) || Bard (6) || 20–20 || W2
|- style="background:#fbb;"
| 41 || September 7 || @ Padres || 0–1 || Pomeranz (1–0) || Estévez (1–2) || — || 20–21 || L1
|- style="background:#fbb;"
| 42 || September 8 || @ Padres || 5–14 || Clevinger (2–2) || Gonzalez (0–1) || — || 20–22 || L2
|- style="background:#fbb;"
| 43 || September 9 || @ Padres || 3–5 || Davies (7–2) || Senzatela (3–2) || Rosenthal (9) || 20–23 || L3
|- style="background:#cfc;"
| 44 || September 11 || Angels || 8–4 || Bard (3–2) || Buttrey (1–3) || — || 21–23 || W1 
|- style="background:#fbb;"
| 45 || September 12 || Angels || 2–5 (11) || Buttrey (2–3) || Kinley (0–2) || Andriese (1) || 21–24 || L1 
|- style="background:#fbb;"
| 46 || September 13 || Angels || 3–5 || Heaney (4–3) || Estévez (1–3) || Andriese (2) || 21–25 || L2
|- style="background:#cfc;"
| 47 || September 15 || Athletics || 3–1 || Senzatela (4–2) || Manaea (4–3) || — || 22–25 || W1
|- style="background:#fbb;"
| 48 || September 16 || Athletics || 1–3 || Fiers (6–2) || Márquez (2–6) || Hendriks (13) || 22–26 || L1
|- style="background:#fbb;"
| 49 || September 17 || Dodgers || 3–9 || Floro (2–0) || Freeland (2–2) || — || 22–27 || L2 
|- style="background:#fbb;"
| 50 || September 18 || Dodgers || 6–15 || White (1–0) || Castellani (1–3) || — || 22–28 || L3
|- style="background:#fbb;"
| 51 || September 19 || Dodgers || 1–6 || Kershaw (6–2) || Gonzalez (0–2) || — || 22–29 || L4
|- style="background:#cfc;"
| 52 || September 20 || Dodgers || 6–3 || Senzatela (5–2) || Gonsolin (1–2) || Givens (1) || 23–29 || W1
|- style="background: #cfc;"
| 53 || September 21 || @ Giants || 7–2 || Márquez (3–6) || Cueto (2–2 || — || 24–29 || W2 
|- style="background:#fbb;"
| 54 || September 22 || @ Giants || 2–5 || Rogers (3–3) || Díaz (1–2) || Coonrod (3) || 24–30 || L1 
|- style="background:#fbb;" 
| 55 || September 23 || @ Giants || 2–7 || Webb (3–4) || Castellani (1–4) || — || 24–31 || L2 
|- style="background:#cfc;"
| 56 || September 24 || @ Giants || 5–4  || Bard (4–2) || Cahill (1–2) || Díaz (4) || 25–31 || W1
|- style="background:#fbb;"
| 57 || September 25  || @ Diamondbacks || 0–4  || Gallen (3–2) || Senzatela (5–3) || Crichton (5) || 25–32 || L1
|- style="background:#fbb;"
| 58 || September 25  || @ Diamondbacks || 5–11  || Clarke (3–0) || Santos (0–1) || — || 25–33 || L2
|- style="background:#cfc;"
| 59 || September 26 || @ Diamondbacks || 10–3 || Márquez (4–6) || Weaver (1–9) || — || 26–33 || W1
|- style="background:#fbb;"
| 60 || September 27 || @ Diamondbacks || 3–11 || Bumgarner (1–4) || Freeland (2–3) || — || 26–34 || L1
|-

|- style="text-align:center;"
| Legend:       = Win       = Loss       = PostponementBold = Rockies team member

Roster

Player stats

List does not include pitchers. Stats in bold are the team leaders.

Note: G = Games played; AB = At bats; R = Runs; H = Hits; 2B = Doubles; 3B = Triples; HR = Home runs; RBI = Runs batted in; BB = Walks; SO = Strikeouts; AVG = Batting average; OBP = On-base percentage; SLG = Slugging; OPS = On Base + Slugging

Pitching
List does not include position players. Stats in bold are the team leaders.

Note: W = Wins; L = Losses; ERA = Earned run average; G = Games pitched; GS = Games started; SV = Saves; IP = Innings pitched; R = Runs allowed; ER = Earned runs allowed; BB = Walks allowed; K = Strikeouts

Farm system

References

External links
2020 Colorado Rockies season Official Site
2020 Colorado Rockies season at Baseball Reference

Colorado Rockies seasons
Colorado Rockies
Colorado Rockies
2020s in Denver